The National Institute of Mountaineering and Allied Sports (NIMAS) is an autonomous institute under the Indian Ministry of Defence, which provides specialized training in mountain rescue, mountaineering and adventure sports. The institute was founded by the Government of Arunachal Pradesh and is located in Dirang of the West Kameng district of Arunachal Pradesh. NIMAS is the first National Institute of India mandated to conduct adventure courses in the field of land, air and aqua.

History 
The Institute was established on 30 May 2013. Col Sarfraz Singh is the first director of NIMAS.

Courses 
The institute offers variety of mountaineering, aero and water related courses.
 Basic Mountaineering Course 
 Advance Mountaineering Course
 Method of Instruction Course
 Search & Rescue Course
 Basic MTB course
 Advance MTB Course
 Mountain Guide Course
 Special Land Adventure Courses 
 Special Aqua Adventure Courses
 Basic & Intermediate White Water Rafting Course
 Basic & Advance Para Gliding Course
 Basic & Intermediate Para Motor Course
 Mountaineering Expedition course
 Rafting Expedition course

See also 
 Mountaineering in India
 Indian Mountaineering Foundation

References

External links 
 Official website

Mountaineering in India
Educational institutions established in 2011
Education in Arunachal Pradesh
Educational organisations based in India
2011 establishments in Arunachal Pradesh